Nermin Jamak (born 25 August 1986) is a Bosnian professional footballer who plays as a midfielder for First League of FBiH club Vis Simm-Bau.

Career
Jamak went through the entire Željezničar academy, signing a professional contract and debuting in 2005 for the first team, alongside Edin Džeko. He debuted for the club in a game vs. NK Posušje on 6 August 2005. 

In January 2009 he left his first club, and, after negotiations with Croatian side RNK Split fell through, he signed for Čelik Zenica.

He spent 2 years in Zenica, establishing himself as a first team player, before returning to Željezničar in January 2011, when his contract expired. Jamak remained there until late summer 2014 when he, after playing UEFA Europa League qualifiers for Željezničar, moved abroad, to 1. HNL side Osijek, debuting for his new club in a 0–1 home loss against Rijeka on 13 September 2014, coming in for Ivan Baraban in the second half. After Osijek, Jamak also played for Lithuanian side Sūduva and Zrinjski Mostar back in Bosnia. He then came back to Čelik in July 2018, becoming one of the best players of the club and of the whole league as well. Jamak was let go by the club on 21 January 2020.

On 14 February 2020, he came back to Željezničar for a second time, signing a one-and-a-half-year contract with the club. He played his first official match after his second return to Željezničar on 22 February 2020, a 0–0 league draw against Radnik Bijeljina on 22 February 2020. Jamak terminated his contract with Željezničar and left the club on 18 December 2020.

Eight days after leaving Željezničar, on 26 December, Jamak signed a contract with First League of FBiH club Vis Simm-Bau.

Honours
Željezničar 
Bosnian Premier League: 2011–12, 2012–13
Bosnian Cup: 2010–11, 2011–12

Zrinjski Mostar 
Bosnian Premier League: 2016–17, 2017–18

References

External links
Nermin Jamak at Sofascore

1986 births
Living people
Bosnia and Herzegovina footballers
Bosnia and Herzegovina expatriate footballers
Expatriate footballers in Croatia
Expatriate footballers in Lithuania
Bosnia and Herzegovina expatriate sportspeople in Croatia
Bosnia and Herzegovina expatriate sportspeople in Lithuania
Premier League of Bosnia and Herzegovina players
Croatian Football League players
A Lyga players
First League of the Federation of Bosnia and Herzegovina players
FK Željezničar Sarajevo players
NK Čelik Zenica players
NK Osijek players
FK Sūduva Marijampolė players
HŠK Zrinjski Mostar players
NK Vis Simm-Bau players
Association football midfielders